Ramesses "Leatherface" Nightingale (born 1975) is a professional wrestler and actor. In his early years, his work included acting roles in Dr. Quinn Medicine Woman and Walt Disney's Under Wraps. He gained a high level of popularity after his appearance on Viva La Bam Season 2, Episode 7 "Tree Top Casino". He has also appeared in music videos such as Bloodhound Gang's "Uhn Tiss Uhn Tiss Uhn Tiss" and Papa Roach's "...To Be Loved". His most current work is feature film Miles to Go (2018) where he plays a brutal killer, with fellow actors Christian Kane and James Duval.

Movies/TV
 Smosh "Ultimate Assassin's Creed 3 video"-2013
 The N Word "Short Film" as Little Man- 2017
 Monster Quest~ As Leatherface -2009 History Channel
 Howard Stern TV~ Fart Olympics- Accompanied -2006
 Junkie "Feature Film" as Carl Banks- 2018
 Viva La Bam~ As Leatherface -2004 MTV
 Dr. Quinn, Medicine Woman~ Extra -1999 GMC
 Walt Disney's Under Wraps~ Extra -1997
 Off The Hook Television Series~ As Leatherface -2005/2006/2007/2009 TVN

Radio

 Sirius Satellite Radio Jason Ellis radio show~ Appearance -2006
 Sirius Satellite Radio Playboy Radio~ AVN Interview -2006
 Howard Stern TV~ Fart Olympics- Accompanied -2006
 The Dirty Twig Show~ Co Host -2008/2009 Syndicate Radio

Music videos

 Smosh Music video "Ultimate Assassins Creed 3 Video" -2013
 "...To Be Loved" by Papa Roach~ As Leatherface -2006 Geffen Records
 "Uhn Tiss Uhn Tiss Uhn Tiss" by Bloodhound Gang~ As Leatherface -2005 Geffen Records

References

External links
 Leatherface in Sac News and Review
 
Various Online Articles etc for Leatherface
 Sacramento News & Review - Local jackasses - News - Local Stories - July 29, 2004  

Living people
Male actors from California
1981 births
American Internet celebrities
Sportspeople from Modesto, California
Professional wrestlers from California
American male film actors
American male television actors